Mangalia, ancient Callatis (other historical names: Pangalia, Panglicara, Tomisovara), is a city and a port on the coast of the Black Sea in the south-east of Constanța County, Northern Dobruja, Romania.

The municipality of Mangalia also administers several summertime seaside resorts: Cap Aurora, Jupiter, Neptun, Olimp, Saturn, Venus.

History
The Greek town Callatis existed until the mid-7th century under this name. Life in the town resumed from the 10th century. In the 13th century Callatis came to be known as Pangalia. The Vlachs called it Tomisovara and the Greeks called it Panglicara. From the 16th century the town had acquired its present name, Mangalia.

A Greek colony named Callatis was founded in the 6th century BC by the city of Heraclea Pontica. Its first silver coinage was minted around 350 BC. In 72 BC, Callatis was conquered by the Roman general Lucullus and was assigned to the Roman province of Moesia Inferior. Throughout the 2nd century AD, the city built defensive fortifications and the minting of coinage under the Roman emperors Septimius Severus and Caracalla continued. Callatis suffered multiple invasions in the 3rd century AD but recovered in the 4th century AD to regain its status as an important trade hub and port city. From the 7th to the 11th century the city was under the rule of the First Bulgarian Empire.

Geography and climate
Mangalia is one of the southernmost resorts on the Romanian coast of the Black Sea.

Mangalia is characterized by a moderate maritime climate (annual average temperature  - one of the highest in Romania) with hot summers (July average over ) and mild winters (January average ), Mangalia being the country's second place, after Băile Herculane, with positive average temperatures in wintertime. Spring comes early but is cool and autumn is long and warm. In summer, cloudiness is reduced (about 25 sunny days in a month) and the duration of sunshine is of 10–12 hours a day. Annual precipitation is low (about ).

The sea breeze is stronger in summer. The natural cure factors are the water of the Black Sea, which is chlorided, sulphated, sodic, magnesian, hypotonic (mineralization 15.5g), the sulphurous, chlorided, bicarbonated, sodic, calcic, mesothermal (21-28 °C) mineral waters of the springs in the northern part of the city, in the area of the beach between Saturn and Venus, the sulphurous peat mud, rich in minerals, which is extracted from the peat bog north of the city (expected to last another 250 years) and the marine climate, rich in saline aerosols and solar radiation that have a bracing effect on the organism.

The resort has a large, fine-sand beach developed for purposes of aeroheliotherapy and wave therapy, as well as high seawalls with a specific microclimate where one may benefit from inhalations of saline aerosols having therapeutic effects.

Demographics

At the 2011 census, 90.6% of the city's residents were ethnic Romanians, 4.4% Turks, 3.6% Tatars, 0.5% Roma, 0.3% Lipovans, and 0.6% belonged to other ethnic groups. According to religion, for respondents for whom data is available, 89.5% were Romanian Orthodox, 8.3% Muslim, 0.9% Roman Catholic, 0.3% Pentecostal, and 1% other or none.

Tourist attractions
 The city has been well known in recent years as the place where one of the largest summer festivals in Romania takes place: Callatis Festival;
 The Scythian tomb discovered in 1959 where archaeologists unearthed fragments of a papyrus in Greek, the first document of this kind in Romania; 
 The incineration tombs (the necropolis of the Callatis citadel, dating back to the 4th-2nd centuries BC);
 The ruins of the Callatis citadel (6th century BC);
 The Turkish Esmahan Sultan Mosque (16th century); 
 The Archaeology Museum which shelters a rich collection of amphorae and sculptures from the Hellenistic epoch, fragments of stone sarcophagi;
 Mangalia Marina

Gallery

Natives 
 Satyrus the Peripatetic (c. 3rd century BC), Greek peripatetic philosopher and historian 
 Inna, singer
 Denis Alibec, footballer

Politics 

The current mayor of Mangalia is Cristian Radu (PNL).

The Mangalia Municipal Council, elected in the 2020 local government elections, is made up of 19 councilors, with the following party composition:

International relations

Mangalia is twinned with:

 Aywaille, Belgium
 Balchik, Bulgaria
 Banská Bystrica, Slovakia
 Byblos, Lebanon
 Charleville-Mézières, France
 General Toshevo, Bulgaria
 Greenport, United States
 Karmiel, Israel
 Laurium, Greece
 Pale, Bosnia and Herzegovina

 Porto Viro, Italy
 Santa Severina, Italy
 Struga, North Macedonia

References

 Alexandru Avram. Kallatis. - In: Ancient Greek Colonies in the Black Sea. Vol. 1. Eds. Dimitrios V. Grammenos and Elias K. Petropoulos. Oxford,  Archaeopress, 2001 (BAR International Series; 1675 (1-2)), 239–286.

 
Populated places established in the 6th century BC
Greek colonies in Scythia Minor
Populated places in Constanța County
Localities in Northern Dobruja
Populated coastal places in Romania
Cities in Romania
Port cities and towns in Romania
Spa towns in Romania
Byzantine sites in Romania